Charles Tatgenhorst Jr. (August 19, 1883 – January 13, 1961) was an American lawyer, jurist, and politician who served one term as a U.S. Representative from Ohio from 1927 to 1929.

Biography 
Born in Cincinnati, Ohio, Tatgenhorst was educated in the public schools of Cincinnati.
He was graduated from Cincinnati Law School in 1910.
He was admitted to the bar the same year and commenced practice in Cincinnati.
He served as assistant city solicitor for Cincinnati 1914–19.
He moved to Cleves, Ohio, in 1919 and continued the practice of law. Tatgenhorst married Clara Streble and had one son Charles Robert Tatgenhorst who joined him in the practice of law.

Congress 
Tatgenhorst was elected as a Republican to the Seventieth Congress to fill the vacancy caused by the death of Ambrose E.B. Stephens and served from November 8, 1927, to March 3, 1929.
He was not a candidate for renomination in 1928.
He again resumed the practice of his profession in Cincinnati, Ohio.

Judicial career 
Tatgenhorst was elected judge of the Ohio First District Court of Appeals on November 3, 1936, and served until February 8, 1937.
Ohio State bar examiner 1938–1942.
In January 1941 became a member of the Ohio State Banking Board.

Later career and death 
He served as director of Cincinnati Street Railway Co. and Sullivan Electric Co..
He died in Cincinnati, Ohio, January 13, 1961.
He was interred in Spring Grove Cemetery.

Sources

External links

1883 births
1961 deaths
Politicians from Cincinnati
Ohio lawyers
University of Cincinnati College of Law alumni
Burials at Spring Grove Cemetery
20th-century American politicians
People from Cleves, Ohio
Republican Party members of the United States House of Representatives from Ohio
20th-century American judges